Orazio Spínola (1547–1616) was a Roman Catholic cardinal and member of the Pamphili family. The Cardinal designed to episcopally crown the venerated image of Santa Maria delle Vigne, promising its people to crown it every year on its centennial anniversary. 

The image was not crowned in 1916 due to the First world war, but Pope Benedict XV felt national piety for his birthplace and issued a decree of coronation towards the image on 1 November 1920 via his Papal legate, the Archbishop of Genoa Cardinal Tommaso Pio Boggiani.

Biography
On 1 Apr 1601, he was consecrated bishop by Alfonso Paleotti, Archbishop of Bologna. and member of the Pamphili family. While bishop, he was the principal consecrator of Innocenzo Massimi, Bishop of Bertinoro (1615).

References

1547 births
1616 deaths
17th-century Italian cardinals
Pamphili family
Clergy from Rome
17th-century Roman Catholic bishops in Genoa